Sir Arnold Edersheim Overton, KCB, KCMG, MC (8 January 1893 - 10 September 1975) was an English civil servant. The son of a Canon F. A. Overton, he was educated at New College, Oxford, and served in the First World War, before entering the Board of Trade in 1919. He represented Britain at the Ottawa Conference and on the Anglo-American Trade Agreement. He was the Permanent Secretary of the Board of Trade from 1941 to 1945 and of the Ministry of Civil Aviation from 1947 to 1953. Between 1945 and 1947, he had been Minister in Charge of the Middle East Office in Cairo. His son, Hugh, was a diplomat.

References 

1893 births
1975 deaths
English civil servants
Alumni of New College, Oxford
Knights Companion of the Order of the Bath
Knights Commander of the Order of St Michael and St George